Nezbiše is a settlement in the Municipality of Podčetrtek in eastern Slovenia. The area around Podčetrtek was traditionally part of the region of Styria. It is now included in the Savinja Statistical Region.

The local church is dedicated to Saint Catherine and belongs to the Parish of Sveta Ema. It was built in 1772 in the Baroque style.

References

External links
Nezbiše on Geopedia

Populated places in the Municipality of Podčetrtek